Alsophila cucullifera, synonym Cyathea cucullifera, is a species of tree fern native to eastern New Guinea, where it grows in montane forest at an altitude of about 2400 m. The trunk is erect and 2–3 m tall. Fronds are bi- or tripinnate and 2–3 m long. Characteristically of this species, they occur in two whorls of four to six fronds each. The stipe is warty and covered with scales. The scales are dark, glossy, have a narrow paler margin and are large towards the base. Sori occur near the fertile pinnule midvein and are covered by thin, pale brown indusia that are scale-like in appearance.

References

cucullifera
Flora of Papua New Guinea
Plants described in 1962